Oswestry is a civil parish in Shropshire, England.  It contains 140 listed buildings that are recorded in the National Heritage List for England.  Of these, one is listed at Grade I, the highest of the three grades, four are at Grade II*, the middle grade, and the others are at Grade II, the lowest grade.  The parish contains the town of Oswestry and the immediate surrounding area.  The oldest listed building consists of the remains of the castle.  The town grew onward from the 12th century, initially in the area around the castle.  Further growth occurred during the 18th century as the town stood on the London to Holyhead road, and again following the arrival of the railway in 1848.

The listed buildings largely reflect the history of the town.  Most of them are houses, shops, public houses and associated structures, the earliest being timber framed, or with a timber-framed core.  The other listed buildings include churches, memorials and other structures in the churchyard, a cross base, a holy well, schools, a boundary stone, a milestone, structures formerly associated with the railway and now used for other purposes, and two war memorials.

Key

Buildings

References

Citations

Sources

Lists of buildings and structures in Shropshire
Listed